Bizarre Bazaar or variation, may refer to:

Television
 "Bizarre Bazaar" (Amphibia), an episode of Amphibia
 "Bizarre Bazaar", an episode of Beetlejuice; see List of Beetlejuice episodes
 "Bizaare Bazaar", an episode of Digimon; see List of Digimon episodes and films

Events
 Bizarre Bazaar, an event attraction at Universal Studios Singapore for Universal's Halloween Horror Nights
 Bizarre Bazaar, an event at the Whitby Goth Weekend

Other uses
 "Bizarre Bazaar", a 1991 song by Ozric Tentacles off the album Strangeitude

See also

 Bazaar Bizarre, a 2004 documentary about Robert Berdella
 Bazaar of the Bizarre, a 1963 sword and sorcery novelette by Fritz Leiber
 Bazaar of the Bizarre (short story collection), a 1978 anthology by Fritz Leiber
 Bazaar (disambiguation)
 Bizarre (disambiguation)